Especially within the United States and Israel , there are many politicians and prominent individuals who support military action against Iran, in contrast to individuals and organisations opposed to the use of military force against Iran .

Rationale
Especially with regards to the United States and Israel, the primary impetus for an invasion is to halt or at least delay Iran's nuclear program. Israeli prime minister Benjamin Netanyahu has repeatedly stated the threats a nuclear Iran could pose and expressed concern that too long of a delay would lead to a "point of no return", after which Iran would become far more dangerous and virtually immune to a future military intervention. To date, Israel has already launched raids against Syrian and Iraqi nuclear reactors, and some point to the success of these attacks and the lack of retaliation as encouragement for a similar strike against Iran.

In 2006, the United States passed the Iran Freedom and Support Act, which appropriated millions of dollars for human rights Non-governmental organization (NGOs) working in Iran. Several politicians in both countries have claimed the Act is a "stepping stone to war", although the Act prohibits the use of force against Iran.

Both Barack Obama and Benjamin Netanyahu have repeatedly said that a military option should not be taken out of consideration if other means of preventing Iran from acquiring a nuclear weapon fail.

Polls
In a TNS survey conducted in March 2007 among 17,443 people in 27 European Union member states, a majority of 52% agreed with the statement "We must stop countries like Iran from acquiring nuclear weapons, even if that means taking military action". A majority agreed with the statement in 18 member states, while a majority were against in 9 member states.

In 2009, a U.S. poll conducted Sep. 30 to Oct. 1 by the Pew Research Center, found 61% agreed it was more important to prevent Iran from developing nuclear weapons, even if it means taking military action.

In March 2012, a Reuters/Ipsos poll revealed that a majority of Americans, 56%, would support military action against Iran, even if it led to increased gas prices, if there was evidence demonstrating that Tehran was building nuclear weapons .  39% said that they opposed a military strike, while 62% of Americans said that they'd support Israel striking Iran over its nuclear program.

A poll conducted in July 2012 found that 80% of Americans view Iran's nuclear program as a threat to the United States and its NATO allies. 39% viewed it as a very big threat, 41% viewed it was a moderate threat, 12% viewed it as not much of a threat, and 6% viewed it as not being a threat.  In regards to how much of a threat the nuclear program is to Israel, 60% viewed it as a very big threat to Israel while 27% viewed it as a moderate threat.  80% believe that Iran is building nuclear weapons, including 72% of Democrats, 81% of Independents, and 89% of Republicans.

A poll conducted in September 2012 by Basswood Research for The Foreign Policy Initiative revealed that Iran was cited as the most dangerous threat to American national security interests, with 45.1% of respondents choosing Iran .  In addition, 62% of Americans favored preventing Iran from obtaining nuclear weapons, even if this requires the use of military force, as opposed to avoiding a conflict and accepting the prospects of Iranian nuclear weapons.

Support from politicians

Republican presidential candidate Rudy Giuliani stated that the United States and allies would do everything necessary to prevent Iran from going nuclear stating the "absolute assurance that we will - if they get to the point where they are going to become a nuclear power - we will prevent them or we'll set them back five or 10 years.  And that is not said as a threat. That should be said as a promise."

Freedom's Watch, an NPO created by Dick Cheney, planned to sponsor a private conservative forum on radical Islam to prove that Iran was a threat to the security of the US and to gather support for the war against Iran.

Former Governor of Massachusetts and 2008 Presidential candidate Mitt Romney had stated his support for military action against the Iranian regime categorizing the possible bombardment of nuclear facilities as a way to prevent Iran from proliferating a nuclear weapon.  He stated that he would support a "bombardment of some kind...if severe economic and diplomatic sanctions aren't enough".

In July 2009, former ambassador of the US to the United Nations John Bolton wrote an article for the Washington Post, in which he said that a military attack against Iran's weapons facilities was the only way to stop Iran from getting nuclear weapons, and that the logic for an Israeli strike was "nearly inexorable."  He also said that a decision to launch a strike should be made soon.

See also
Opposition to military action against Iran
United States-Iran relations
Iran and weapons of mass destruction
Iran and state-sponsored terrorism
United Nations Security Council Resolution 1747

References

Iran–United States relations
People's Mojahedin Organization of Iran